Saint John Paul II Academy (formerly Pope John Paul II High School) is a private, Catholic, coeducational, college-preparatory secondary education institution run by the Eastern North America District of the Institute of the Brothers of the Christian Schools in a  campus in East Boca Raton, Florida, adjacent to the main campus of Lynn University.  The school opened in 1980. Saint John Paul II Academy follows the tradition of Saint John Baptist De La Salle and the Brothers of the Christian Schools.

Athletics and clubs
Fall, Winter and Spring Varsity and Junior Varsity sports include: football, cheerleading, boys and girls basketball, swimming, golf, cross country, track, girls volleyball, boys and girls soccer, baseball, tennis, and lacrosse. Clubs include Drama/Thespian, Robotics, Lasallian Youth, Art, Spirit, Science, DECA, Best Buddies, Chess, Model UN, Music Ensemble, Respect Life and SADD.

References

External links

Official website

Catholic secondary schools in Florida
Lasallian schools in the United States
Educational institutions established in 1980
Buildings and structures in Boca Raton, Florida
High schools in Palm Beach County, Florida
Schools accredited by the Southern Association of Colleges and Schools
Roman Catholic Diocese of Palm Beach
1980 establishments in Florida